Tomáš Vychodil (born 7 October 1975) is a Czech-Russian football coach and former player.

Career

After playing in the Czech Republic and declining an offer from German club Darmstadt, Vychodil left for Russia to further his career with Kristall Smolensk, signing after a trial through former UNEX Uničov coach Alexandr Bokij.

References

External links
 

1975 births
Living people
Czech footballers
Russian footballers
Association football defenders
SK Sigma Olomouc players
SFC Opava players
FC Khimki players
FC Tom Tomsk players
FC Sibir Novosibirsk players
Russian Premier League players
FC Kristall Smolensk players
Russian people of Czech descent
Czech emigrants to Russia
Naturalised citizens of Russia
FC Novokuznetsk players
Sportspeople from Olomouc